Schwarzbach is a municipality in the Oberspreewald-Lausitz district, in Upper Lusatia, Brandenburg, Germany.

History
From 1815 to 1824, Schwarzbach was part of the Prussian Province of Brandenburg. From 1825 to 1919 it was part of the Province of Silesia, from 1919 to 1938 of the Province of Lower Silesia, from 1938 to 1941 again of the Province of Silesia and from 1941 to 1945 again of the Province of Lower Silesia. From 1945 to 1952 it was part of Saxony and from 1952 to 1990 of the Bezirk Cottbus of East Germany.

Demography

References

Populated places in Oberspreewald-Lausitz